Marquis Calmes IV (1755-1834) was an American military leader.

Biography
Calmes' father was William Waller Calmes, 1727–1773. Calmes' mother was Lucy Neville.

Calmes was born 26 February 1755 in Shenandoah, Virginia, as the fourth Marquis de Calmes. As a young man, he was sent abroad to be educated. When the American Revolution started, he returned to Virginia. He raised and equipped a company at his own expense, and joined the 2nd Virginia Regiment as a lieutenant.

At the Battle of Brandywine, Colonel Thomas Marshall, the commander of the Second Regiment, was seriously injured. Calmes replaced Marshall at the battle. Calmes was then promoted to captain.

Calmes served in the Second Regiment until the conclusion of his term of service in 1779. He left Virginia and made his way to Kentucky, where he settled near Colonel Marshall in Woodford County, Kentucky.    Calmes was one of the founders of Versailles, Kentucky. He married Priscilla Hale.

In 1795, he served in the Kentucky State Legislature.

During the War of 1812, Calmes was promoted to Brigadier General and given command of a brigade of Kentucky riflemen. He served under William Henry Harrison.

Following the War of 1812, Calmes returned again to his estate near Versailles, Kentucky. He died on February 27, 1834.

References

Continental Army officers from Virginia
Huguenot participants in the American Revolution
1755 births
1834 deaths
People from Shenandoah, Virginia